East Peak is a mountain in the Carson Range of western Nevada, United States. It is the highest point in Douglas County. The summit is in the Heavenly ski area and is the location of East Peak Lodge.

References

External links
 

Mountains of Nevada
Landforms of Douglas County, Nevada